Men's trampoline competition at the 2008 Summer Olympics was held on 16–19 August at the Beijing National Indoor Stadium.
The competition consisted of two rounds. In the first, each trampolinist performed two routines on the trampoline. One routine had to include required elements, while the other was a voluntary routine. Scores were given for both execution and difficulty in each routine, summed to give a routine score. The two routine scores in the first round determined qualification for the second; the eight top finishers moved on to the final. The final consisted entirely of a single voluntary routine, with no preliminary scores being carried over.

Qualified competitors

 Q = Qualified for Finals
 R = Reserve
 T = Tie break

Final

References

 Competition format
 Qualification Results
 Men's final

2008 Men's
Trampoline, Men's
Men's events at the 2008 Summer Olympics